Paul-Gordon Chandler (born 1964) is the Bishop of the Episcopal Diocese of Wyoming in the USA. An author, art curator, peacemaker, and social entrepreneur, his previous roles have included serving as both a non-profit executive and US Episcopal priest.  Paul-Gordon Chandler grew up in West Africa (Senegal) and has lived and worked in leadership roles throughout the world, with an emphasis on the Middle East and Africa, with ecumenical publishing, relief and development agencies, the arts and The Episcopal Church. His acclaimed book on Kahlil Gibran, the best-selling Lebanese born poet-artist and author of The Prophet, is IN SEARCH OF A PROPHET: A Spiritual Journey with Kahlil Gibran.

In 2020, he was awarded by the Archbishop of Canterbury the Hubert Walter Award for Reconciliation and Interfaith Cooperation, the highest international award for outstanding service in the work of reconciliation and interfaith dialogue within the Anglican Communion.

Chandler is a direct descendant of Samuel Jordan, the early English settler and Ancient Planter of colonial Jamestown, and one of the first colonial legislators. He is also of Irish (Celtic) descent.

Life 

He is the bishop of the Episcopal Diocese of Wyoming in the USA. Previously, he was the Rector of the Anglican Church in Qatar (The Church of the Epiphany & The Anglican Center) in Doha, Qatar in the Persian Gulf, a church that hosts between 15,000 and 20,000 people from 65 countries in its building every weekend. He is also the Founding President of CARAVAN, an international non-profit/NGO that is "a recognized leader in using the arts to further our global quest for a more harmonious future, both with each other and with the earth." From 2003 to 2013, for ten years, he was the Rector of St. John's Episcopal Church in Cairo, Egypt, within the Anglican/Episcopal Diocese of Egypt & North Africa. St. John's Episcopal Church is the international English-speaking Episcopal/Anglican church in southern Cairo with an international congregation of over 40 nationalities from many faith traditions.

Immediately prior to this role, he served as the President/CEO of Partners International (PI), an international ecumenical relief and development organization that exists to assist and empower indigenous faith-based non-governmental organizations (NGOs) in over 70 countries. Before serving with PI, he was the U.S. Chief Executive Officer (CEO) of IBS Publishing, a publishing, distribution, and linguistics non-profit that works in over 500 languages.

Prior to that he worked with the Anglican Church for five years. From 1995 to 1997, he worked with SPCK Publishing in London, England as the Director of SPCK Worldwide, an international publishing agency of the Church of England involved in publishing and communications in the UK and throughout the Two-Thirds World.  Before this he served in Tunisia, North Africa, as the Rector of St. George's Episcopal Church in Tunis/Carthage and Chaplain to the British Embassy. St. George's Church was the only English-speaking church in Tunisia, a Muslim majority country, and served as the English-speaking church congregation to internationals from over 30 nationalities living and working in Tunisia. Prior to that, he worked with IBS Publishing as Director of International Programs and served for several years directing translation, publishing and distribution projects throughout the world, in over 100 countries.

He studied at Wheaton College, where he majored in Theological Studies (B.A. 1986), and also at Chichester Theological College (a Church of England institution) in England.

Books

Paul-Gordon Chandler's acclaimed book on Kahlil Gibran, the best-selling Lebanese born poet-artist and author of The Prophet, is IN SEARCH OF A PROPHET: A Spiritual Journey with Kahlil  Gibran (Rowman & Littlefield, 2017). He is also the author of a highly regarded book on Muslim-Christian relations titled Pilgrims of Christ on the Muslim Road: Exploring a New Path Between Two Faiths (Rowman & Littlefield) that focuses on what we can be learned from the life and thought of Mazhar Mallouhi, the well-known Syrian Arab novelist and “Sufi Muslim follower of Christ”. His first book was God’s Global Mosaic, What We Can Learn from Christians Around the World (InterVarsity Press/IVP, 2000). Chandler is also the author of Songs In Waiting: Spiritual Reflections on Christ's Birth...A Celebration of Middle Eastern Canticles (Morehouse Publishing, 2009). Additionally, he has written numerous articles in various publications.

References

External links
Paul-Gordon Chandler's Website
CARAVAN - Transformation through the Arts

Further reading
"A Journey of a Lifetime" An interview with Paul-Gordon Chandler in Artscoops - May 15, 2018
"A Journey into Kahlil Gibran's Spirituality" Asharq Al-Awsat (English) - May 9, 2018
"Exploring the Inner Journey of Kahlil Gibran" Paul-Gordon Chandler, The Interfaith Observer - March 15, 2018
"Building Bridges through the Arts" An Interview with Paul-Gordon Chandler in LEADERS Magazine of Saudi Arabia - December 2017
Todd Fine interviews Paul-Gordon Chandler about Kahlil Gibran HuffPost - November 14, 2017
An Interview With Rev Paul Gordon Chandler On Arts Peacebuilding Artylst - August 20, 2017
Paul-Gordon Chandler: Peace-building through the Arts Faith and Leadership, Duke Divinity School - March 22, 2016

1964 births
Living people
Alumni of Chichester Theological College
American Episcopal clergy
American people of English descent
American people of Irish descent
Anglican writers
Episcopal bishops of Wyoming
Wheaton College (Illinois) alumni